Laurie Davies may refer to:

 Laurie Davies (footballer) (1916–2005), Australian rules footballer
 Laurie Davies (politician) (1962–) California politician